Zaslin active protection system (is often incorrectly named with Russian word Zaslon) is being developed by Microtek in cooperation with other military design organizations. The system is designed to protect stationary or mobile targets from anti-tank weapons with flat or diving trajectories using various types of guidance systems and warheads. Unlike existing Russian-designed active protection systems Drozd and Arena, Zaslin can be deployed alongside reactive armour placed in the turret area, which is vulnerable to anti-tank projectiles traveling at speeds up to

Design 
The Zaslin system consists of a radar-based detection module, a guidance module and static counter-measure modules. Each counter-measure module packs two explosive charges, which are ejected toward the target before detonating and forming a dense fragmentation ring that destroys incoming projectiles on impact. Modules can point forward, sideways or vertically, to protect from attacks from above. The system's response time is 0.1 seconds.

A typical installation protects 150–180 degrees, and is capable of defeating incoming projectiles at speeds between 70 and 1,200 m/s. It can be used to protect fixed sites or armored vehicles.

Lightweight version 
Microtek also developed AP system for lightweight armored fighting vehicles. AP's mission capability has been proven for armor-piercing projectiles and small-caliber gun shells. Light AP Zaslin will comprise a system of nonrecoverable, detachable modules of various kinds, with two accommodated on the vehicle's upper forebody and as many on its sides (in its integrated configuration). As pointed out by the system designer, the Zaslin lightweight AP system is effective against RPG-7 and RPG-29 rounds, as well as anti-tank guided missiles. However, it will not shield against hollow-charge artillery shells or armor-piercing sub-caliber shells which have thicker walls than grenades or TRG projectiles.

Variants 
 Zaslin – basic version
 Zaslin-L – lighter version
 Akkor-Pulat – Turkish active protection system based on the Zaslin-L. The difference from Zaslin-L is that it is designed as a modular disposable unit that is lighter and easier to integrate.

References

External links 
  Microtek
 UKROBORONSERVICE

Armoured fighting vehicle equipment
Weapons countermeasures
Land active protection systems